Debora L. Spar is the current Senior Associate Dean of Harvard Business School Online and former President of Barnard College, a liberal arts college for women of Columbia University. As President of Barnard, she was also an academic dean within Columbia University. Spar was appointed Barnard's 7th president in July 2008 and replaced Judith Shapiro, Barnard's 6th president, after a teaching career at Harvard Business School where she was Professor of Business Administration and Senior Associate Dean for Faculty Research and Development. Spar was appointed the 10th president of Lincoln Center for the Performing Arts, beginning in March 2017, but announced her resignation in April 2018 after only about one year in the position. She became the new Senior Associate Dean of Harvard Business School Online in January 2020.

Education
Spar graduated magna cum laude in 1984 from the Edmund A. Walsh School of Foreign Service at Georgetown University and earned her doctorate from Harvard University in government.  She is Jewish.

Research and academic interests
Spar has written about the economics of the human fertility industry and the evolution of the Internet. Her work on the economics of fertility drew wide attention.

She has appeared on 60 Minutes, The News Hour with Jim Lehrer, ABC World News Tonight, and in many newspapers and magazines. Her own articles have appeared in publications ranging from The New England Journal of Medicine to Foreign Affairs to The Review of International Political Economy.

In 2001, she wrote an article called "Why the Internet Doesn't Change Everything" which described the distinctive nature of the internet industry. Her book, The Baby Business: How Money, Science and Politics Drive the Commerce of Conception, pioneered research about the economy of alternative fertility. Spar was the first academic to mention fertility as a transaction through a business framework. In various interviews online, Spar said that when she picked up the research topic of fertility through an economic lens, her colleagues did not take her seriously and called her soft. She followed up in 2006 with a book named The Hidden Market for Babies. Spar has also written about AIDS, African economics, the global economy, the balance of power, and terrorism.

A leading figure in business academics, Spar also ran Making Markets Work, joint program between Harvard Business School and the University of Pretoria Gordon Institute of Business Science. The course in South Africa teaches about the interconnection of the public and private sectors' effects on economic growth. Spar also spearheaded the initiative in Rwanda, where cabinet members learned about executive education.

Leadership
During her inaugural address on October 23, 2008, Spar cited a number of goals for her term as President of Barnard College. Paramount were her desire to make Barnard a more internationally recognized institution for women, as well as expand and improve the current Barnard Leadership Initiative (BLI). She followed up on this goal by converting BLI into Barnard's Athena Center for Leadership Studies.

Spar also served as a member of the Board of Directors of American investment bank Goldman Sachs from June 2011 to April 2017.

Works
 The Baby Business, Harvard Business School Press, 2006
 Ruling the Waves: Cycles of Discovery, Chaos, and Wealth from the Compass to the Internet
 The Cooperative Edge: The Internal Politics of International Cartels
 Beyond Globalism: Remaking American Foreign Economic Policy
 Wonder Women: Sex, Power, and the Quest for Perfection, 2013
 Work Mate Marry Love: How Machines Shape Our Human Destiny, 2020

References

External links
 Debora Spar profile | Barnard College
 "Debora Spar collected news and commentary" Columbia Spectator

Living people
Presidents of Barnard College
Walsh School of Foreign Service alumni
Harvard University alumni
Columbia University faculty
Harvard Business School faculty
Academic staff of the University of Pretoria
Directors of Goldman Sachs
American Jews
Year of birth missing (living people)